The 1970 Liège–Bastogne–Liège was the 56th edition of the Liège–Bastogne–Liège cycle race and was held on 17 April 1970. The race started and finished in Liège. The race was won by Roger De Vlaeminck of the Flandria team.

General classification

References

1970
1970 in Belgian sport